Angelica is a town in the middle of Allegany County, New York, United States. The population was 1,284 at the 2020 census. The town is named after Angelica Schuyler Church, the sister of Elizabeth Schuyler Hamilton, activist, scholar, devoted sister and mother, daughter of General Philip Schuyler, sister-in-law of Founding Father Alexander Hamilton and wife of John Barker Church. The town was named by Philip Schuyler Church, who was one of the original European settlers of the area, and the son of Angelica and John Barker Church.  The village of Angelica is located within this town.

History

The area was first settled around 1802 at Angelica village. The town of Angelica was formed in 1805 from the town of Leicester in Livingston County, before Allegany County was formed. Angelica is the oldest town in Allegany County. The town hall is housed in the Old Allegany County Courthouse, listed on the National Register of Historic Places in 1972. Belvidere was also listed in 1972, and the Moses Van Campen House was listed in 2004.

Angelica Schuyler Church was an American woman who encouraged other women to fight for their voices, and a witty, society-loving sister of Elizabeth Schuyler Hamilton, who, when young, was much less suited to society than Angelica, preferring to run wild and, when older, tend to the injured soldiers. As a young woman, Angelica eloped with John Church, who was using the pseudonym “Jack Carter”. In 1797, the young United States paid back its war debt to Church in the form of 100,000 acres of land in Western New York. Angelica’s son Philip Schuyler Church travelled to what is now Allegheny and Genesee Counties to take possession of the land, with his surveyor Moses Van Campen. A planned village was laid out with the plots and design to be reminiscent of Paris, France (a circular drive in the center, streets coming to that drive to form a star, and five churches situated around the circle). In the center of the circular drive is the village park. Philip named his planned village Angelica, after his mother.

The historian John S. Minard wrote of the town's establishment in Allegany County and Its People (1896):"The town was formed by an act of the Legislature, passed Feb. 25, 1805, and described as "being in width twelve miles," just that of the Morris Reserve, and in length "from south to north extending thirty-four miles from the Pennsylvania line," taking in about two-thirds of the towns of Granger and Grove. It was taken from Leicester, and when erected was a part of Genesee county. (The village had been founded three or four years before, and named by Capt. Philip Church for his mother, Angelica, the eldest daughter of Gen. Philip Schuyler.[2]"Philip left to marry Anna Matilda Stewart, daughter of General Walter Stewart in Philadelphia. For their honeymoon, they traveled first by boat, then by raft as far west as Bath, New York, then on horseback to the banks of the Genesee River. They constructed a small house, soon to be whitewashed and known as the "white house". In 1804, they had their mansion built (known as "Belvidere"). It still stands on the banks of the Genesee near Angelica, New York.

Geography

The Southern Tier Expressway (Interstate 86 and New York State Route 17) passes through the town.

The Genesee River flows northward through the southwest part of the town.

Demographics

As of the census of 2000, there were 1,411 people, 564 households, and 382 families residing in the town. The population density was 38.7 people per square mile (14.9/km2). There were 774 housing units at an average density of 21.2 per square mile (8.2/km2). The racial makeup of the town was 97.87% White, 0.28% Black or African American, 0.50% Native American, 0.07% Asian, and 1.28% from two or more races. Hispanic or Latino of any race were 0.35% of the population.

There were 564 households, out of which 32.8% had children under the age of 18 living with them, 54.4% were married couples living together, 10.1% had a female householder with no husband present, and 32.1% were non-families. 27.1% of all households were made up of individuals, and 11.7% had someone living alone who was 65 years of age or older.  The average household size was 2.50 and the average family size was 3.03.

In the town, the population was spread out, with 27.4% under the age of 18, 7.0% from 18 to 24, 26.3% from 25 to 44, 24.9% from 45 to 64, and 14.5% who were 65 years of age or older.  The median age was 38 years. For every 100 females, there were 94.9 males.  For every 100 females age 18 and over, there were 93.4 males.

The median income for a household in the town was $33,750, and the median income for a family was $37,891. Males had a median income of $28,958 versus $21,328 for females. The per capita income for the town was $16,348.  About 8.1% of families and 11.8% of the population were below the poverty line, including 16.1% of those under age 18 and 9.3% of those age 65 or over.

Communities and locations in the Town of Angelica 
Angelica – The village of Angelica is centrally located in the town.  It was formerly the county seat.
Bald Mountain – A prominent hill northeast of Angelica village.
Angelica Creek – A tributary of the Genesee River flows through the town and village.

Notable people 

Philip Schuyler Church, founder of the village and son of Angelica Schuyler Church.
 Calvin Fairbank (1816–1898), abolitionist minister, lived in Angelica and is buried in the Until the Day Dawn Cemetery.
 William B. Rochester, former US Congressman
Judson W. Sherman, former US Congressman
 Cornelius Mortimer Treat (1817-1916), Wisconsin farmer, teacher, and politician, was born in Angelica.
 Harvey Ellis (1852-1904), Arts & Crafts movement architect

Climate
This climatic region is typified by large seasonal temperature differences, with warm to hot (and often humid) summers and cold (sometimes severely cold) winters.  According to the Köppen Climate Classification system, Angelica has a humid continental climate, abbreviated "Dfb" on climate maps.

References

External links
Town and village of Angelica official website

New York (state) populated places on the Genesee River
Towns in Allegany County, New York
1805 establishments in New York (state)